The FATACIL, the Craft, Tourism, Agricultural, Commercial and Industrial Fair of Lagoa, occurs annually (since 1980) for 10 days in August in the Parque de Feiras e Exposições (Fair and Exhibition Grounds) in the Algarvan city of Lagoa, Portugal.

The fair is attended each year by thousands of visitors from all parts of the country (the last few years the attendance has been about 180,000), not only because of their interest in promoting traditional arts and crafts which are on the edge of extinction, but also for the shows which occur daily.

Recently there have been about 800 exhibitors of various products including the arts and crafts of Portugal generally, and of the Algarve in particular: articles made of everything from textiles to copper and forged iron; lacework; artifacts made of wood; pottery and ceramics; cork items; basket work; or the typical Algarve puppets of Martim Longo and Querença.

This fair went on hiatus in 2020.

External links
 Cometoportugal.com: FATACIL (Craft, Tourism, Agricultural, Commercial and Industrial Fair of Lagoa) website

Fairs in Portugal
Lagoa, Algarve
Annual fairs
Annual events in Portugal
Art festivals in Portugal
Cultural festivals in Portugal
Trade fairs in Portugal
Summer events in Portugal
1980 establishments in Portugal
Recurring events established in 1980